Nerve Damage is a compilation album by American metal band Skinlab, released in 2004. It is a 2CD collection of rare and unreleased material, including a live set, demos, remixes, alternate mixes, and two new tracks.

Track listing

Disc 1
 "Losing All" – 4:04
 "Beneath The Surface" – 3:07
 "Anthem (Radio Edit)" – 3:13
 "Come Get It (Alternative Mix)" – 3:48
 "One Of Us (Alternative Mix)" – 4:53
 "Jesus Cells (Demo)" – 5:59
 "Disturbing The Art Of Expression (Demo)" – 5:09
 "Take As Needed (Demo)" – 3:32
 "Bullet With Butterfly Wings (Smashing Pumpkins Cover)" – 4:21
 "Slave The Way (Remix)" – 3:00
 "Purify (Remix)" – 3:50
 "Stumble (Suffer EP)" – 4:10
 "Down (Suffer EP)" – 4:08
 "Dissolve (Suffer EP)" – 4:18
 "Noah (Suffer EP)" – 5:24

Disc 2
 "Paleface (Remixed James Murphy Roadrunner Demo)" – 4:22
 "Promised (Roadrunner Demo)" – 6:29
 "The Art Of Suffering (Roadrunner Demo)" – 5:10
 "Ten Seconds (Roadrunner Demo)" – 4:50
 "Race Of Hate (Live Demo)" – 5:19
 "When Pain Comes To Surface (Circle Of Vengeance Demo)" – 3:29
 "Blacklist (Circle Of Vengeance Demo)" – 3:26
 "Slave The Way (Live)" – 2:56
 "Purify (Live)" – 3:57
 "No Sympathy (Live)" – 3:24
 "Scapegoat (Live)" – 3:09
 "Know Your Enemies (Live)" – 2:58
 "Come Get It (Live)" – 4:14
 "When Pain Comes To Surface (Live)" – 3:49

2004 compilation albums
Skinlab albums